Gordon Perks (born October 7, 1963) is a Canadian politician and environmental activist who has served on Toronto City Council since 2006. Perks currently represents Ward 4 Parkdale—High Park.

Career 
Perks has worked for a number of environmental organizations. He was a writer for Pollution Probe from 1987 to 1989 and a "Pulp and Paper" campaigner at Greenpeace Canada from 1989 to 1993. He was executive director of the Better Transportation Coalition from 1994 to 1996 and was a senior campaigner at the Toronto Environmental Alliance from 1997 until 2006 with a focus on waste reduction and public transit. He also works as an adjunct professor at the Environmental Studies department of the University of Toronto.

Perks was the focus of province-wide attention when he disrupted Ontario Premier David Peterson's press conference launching the 1990 provincial election campaign. As Peterson announced the election and began to make a statement as to why his government should be re-elected, Perks appeared with a briefcase chained to his wrist containing a tape recorder playing a recording of environmental promises made by Peterson, in an act of criticism of the Liberal government's environmental record. Perks also heckled Peterson with a bullhorn. Greenpeace and other groups inspired by Perks' disruption plagued Peterson's campaign appearances.

Writer
Perks has written and co-authored a number of publications including The Green Consumer Guide (1989), Waste Less Now (1987) and Oil Drop (1989). In addition, he has written articles for Alternatives magazine and he wrote an environmental column for Torstar-owned Eye Weekly newspaper from 2003 to 2011.

Political career
During the 2006 federal election, Perks was the New Democratic Party candidate for the riding of Davenport. He placed second, losing to the incumbent member of Parliament Mario Silva of the Liberal Party.

Perks later ran for city councillor a few months later during the 2006 Toronto municipal election in Ward 14 Parkdale—High Park. He ran against a slate of 13 other candidates and was endorsed by Mayor David Miller. He won the race by a seven percent margin over his nearest rival.

Perks ran again in the 2010 municipal election. He received an endorsement from the Toronto Star and was once again re-elected in Ward 14, over nine other candidates.

In his second term, Perks was named chair of the Toronto and East York Community Council.

In the 2014 municipal election, Perks was re-elected for a third term. He once again was endorsed by The Star.

Electoral boundaries were adjusted for the 2018 municipal election, and Perks' Ward 14 was amalgamated with Ward 13, the other Parkdale—High Park electoral district. Incumbent Ward 13 councillor Sarah Doucette opted not to run in the newly amalgamated riding and instead endorsed Perks, who ran and won in the newly created Ward 4 Parkdale—High Park.

Electoral record

References
Notes

Citations

External links

Councillors' official voting records

1963 births
Canadian environmentalists
Living people
New Democratic Party candidates for the Canadian House of Commons
Toronto city councillors